Pavel Macenauer (1900 – 30 July 1955) was a Czech tennis player. He competed in the men's singles event at the 1924 Summer Olympics.

References

External links
 

1900 births
1955 deaths
Czech male tennis players
Olympic tennis players of Czechoslovakia
Tennis players at the 1924 Summer Olympics
People from Plzeň-North District
Sportspeople from the Plzeň Region